De Luxe Florida Manufacturing Plant (Spanish: Fábrica de Fomento De Luxe Florida), also known as the De Luxe Caribe Inc. Building (Edificio De Luxe Caribe Inc.), is a historic factory building located in Florida, Puerto Rico. The building was added to the United States National Register of Historic Places in 2012 as it is a prime example of the early prototypes for manufacturing plants in Puerto Rico.

The factory consists of plant number T-0472-0-58 and its addition labeled T-0472-0-66, which integrate the best-known and most successful manufacturing plant of the municipality of Florida. This is one of three prototypical buildings at a small-sized industrial park located northeast of town, alongside Road PR-642, Kilometer 11.1. The L-shaped plant was designed by architect René O. Ramírez, one of Puerto Rico's earliest and most decisively Modern architects. Built in steel and concrete, with an A-frame supported above concrete beams and columns, the property embodies key stylistic considerations pertaining to the Modern Movement in architecture. The De Luxe Florida/Caribe still incorporates all key components identifiable with the manufacturing building as originally designed and built.

References 

Florida, Puerto Rico
1958 establishments in Puerto Rico
Industrial buildings and structures on the National Register of Historic Places in Puerto Rico
Industrial buildings completed in 1958
Modernist architecture in Puerto Rico
Modern Movement architecture